Özkan Sümer (20 November 194022 December 2020) was a Turkish footballer and coach. He played as defender in Trabzonspor (and later coached the same club), Galatasaray SK, and the Turkey national football team. He also served as president of Trabzonspor.

Career

Footballer
Sümer was born in Trabzon and started to play football in his home town's club of Trabzonspor. After some time at Karabükspor and Sebat Gençlik, Sümer re-joined Trabzonspor. He was a successful defender of his team. During this time, he earned the nickname "Deve" (literally: "Camel") due to his tallness and stubborn rough playing temperament.

Manager
After having ended his active sports life, Sümer served as an instructor for a while at the Turkish Football Federation (TFF). He coached later the youth and amateur squads of Trabzonspor before he was appointed manager of the main team in 1978.

Trabzonspor became league champion with Sümer as manager in the seasons 1978–79 and 1980–81. In 1981, he was appointed manager of the Turkey national football team. The national team played two matches under his managership losing both. He then transferred to coach Galatasaray SK in the 1982–83 season. Sümer was manager again at Trabzonspor in the seasons 1984–85, 1990–91 and 1996. In the season 2000–01, he coached Mobellaspor, a Second League club in Konya.

Club president
In 2001, Sümer was elected president of Trabzonspor succeeding Mehmet Ali Yılmaz. He resigned from this post on 5 September 2003 in protest against a resolution made by the Ombudsman Board of the TFF that lifted a ban against Fenerbahçe SK concluded before.

Coordinator
From 22 July 2006 Sümer served as the regional coordinator for education at Trabzonspor.

In 2007, he co-founded the women's football branch of Trabzonspor along with Zeliha Şimşek, a former KTÜ women's club footballer only six weeks before the beginning of the football season. The team was invited to join the Turkish Women's Football Premier League in its first season of 2007–08. Trabzonspor women became league champion already the next season.

Honors

As manager
 Trabzonspor
Turkish Super League
champion 1978–79, 1980–81
President's Cup
winner 1978–79
Prime Minister's Cup
 winner 1984–85 with İlyas Akçay

As club president
 Trabzonspor
Turkish Cup
winner 2002–03

References

1940 births
2020 deaths
Sportspeople from Trabzon
Trabzonspor footballers
Trabzonspor managers
Süper Lig managers
Galatasaray S.K. (football) managers
Turkey national football team managers
Association football defenders
Turkish footballers
Turkish football managers